Jan Jirka (born 5 October 1993) is a Czech sprinter competing primarily in the 200 metres. He won a bronze medal at the 2015 European U23 Championships.

International competitions

1Did not start in the final

Personal bests
Outdoor
100 metres – 10.51 (+1.3 m/s, Prague 2017)
200 metres – 20.75 (+1.4 m/s, Kladno 2018)
Indoor
60 metres – 6.99 (Prague 2013)
200 metres – 20.85 (Prague 2015)

References

1993 births
Living people
Czech male sprinters
Athletes (track and field) at the 2020 Summer Olympics
Olympic athletes of the Czech Republic